Itahisa Machado (born April 10, 1987 in Tenerife, Canary Islands), is a Spanish Mexican actress  and model. She currently resides in Mexico City, Mexico.

Career 
She began her career as a model of commercial television. In 2006 she participated in the telenovela  Yo soy Bea, had 5 years out of television and returned in the soap opera El octavo mandamiento in 2011. She has starred in soap operas such as Rosario and El Dandy.

Filmography

References

External links 

Living people
American telenovela actresses
American female models
21st-century American actresses
People from Tenerife
Spanish expatriates in Mexico
1987 births